LingCloud is a suite of open-source cloud computing system software developed by Institute of Computing Technology, Chinese Academy of Sciences. It is licensed under Apache License 2.0. LingCloud provides a resource single leasing point system for consolidated leasing physical and virtual machines, and supports various heterogeneous application modes including high performance computing, large scale data processing, massive data storage, etc. on shared infrastructure. LingCloud can help an organization to build private cloud to manage the computing infrastructure.

LingCloud is based on Xen virtualization platform and uses OpenNebula to manage the virtual infrastructure.

Components 

The main components of LingCloud release include:

 Molva – The core of LingCloud. It is an elastic computing infrastructure management software providing a heterogeneous resource management and leasing framework, and a single controlling point of both of the infrastructure and applications.
 Portal – System management interface via web. Current modules include:
 Infrastructure management: physical and virtual machines management by partitions and clusters.
 Application encapsulation: virtual appliance creation and management.
 System monitor: clusters run-time information monitor.

Release history 

The open-source version of LingCloud was released in May 2011.

See also 

 OpenNebula
 CNGrid

References

External links 
 
 LingCloud on Google Code

Cloud infrastructure
Free software programmed in Java (programming language)
Free software for cloud computing